Heather Kampf (née Dorniden; born January 19, 1987) is an American middle-distance runner and four-time United States National Champion in the 1 mile road race. Kampf competed for the University of Minnesota and since December 2009 has been a member of Team USA Minnesota.

High school
Kampf graduated from Rosemount High School in Rosemount, Minnesota, in 2005. As a junior on June 11, 2004, at the Minnesota State Track and Field meet, Kampf broke her high school's records in the 400 (55.29) and 800 (2:11.87) meter races en route to becoming the state champion in the 400 meter race and placing third in the 800 meter race. As a senior at the 2005 Minnesota State Track and Field meet Kampf won the state championship in the 800 meter race setting a new state record in the process running a time of 2:10.42. She also ran the 400 meter race placing third in a time of 56.62. In 2003 and 2004 Kampf earned All-State honors in cross country. At the 2003 Minnesota State Cross country meet she placed 15th her junior year running a time of 14:55.7 on the 4 km course.
2004 Minnesota Class AA High School Track and Field 400 m Champion - 55.29 
2005  Minnesota Class AA High School Track and Field 800 m Champion - 2:10.42 (state record)

College
Kampf attended the University of Minnesota in the Twin cities and competed for the Golden Gophers track and field and cross country teams graduating in December 2009 with a Bachelor of Science degree in kinesiology.  While at the University of Minnesota Kampf became the school's most decorated women's track and field athlete in history earning All-American honors eight-times, holding ten school records and becoming the only Golden Gopher to compete in every NCAA championship in cross country, indoor and outdoor track during her time at the university. As a freshman in 2006 Kampf was the NCAA Indoor Track and Field Champion in the 800 meter race. In 2008 Kampf won the University of Minnesota's Golden Goldy female athlete of the year award.

Kampf's ten school records were in the following events:
400 m indoor - 54.71 (2006)
600 m indoor - 1:27.78 (2009)
800 m indoor - 2:04.3 (2006)
800 m outdoor - 2:01.05 (2007)
Mile run indoor - 4:38.80 (2009)
4x400 m relay indoor - 3:40.77 (2006)
4x800 m relay outdoor - 8:27.42 (2007)
4x1600 m relay outdoor - 19:06.11 (2008)
Distance medley relay indoor - 11:07.27 (2006)
Distance medley relay outdoor - 11:08.16 (2007)

She is also known for a 600 meter race in 2008, in which she fell down 200 meters from the finish, dropping her well behind several runners, but recovered to win the race.

Professional career

On March 3, 2014, USA Track and Field announced that Kampf would represent the U.S. at the 2014 World Indoor Championships in Sopot, Poland. Kampf was the first alternate for the women's 1500 m after placing third at the 2014 USA Indoor Track and Field Championships and was named to the team after Mary Cain withdrew from the competition.

On May 24, 2014, Kampf along with teammates Kate Grace, Brenda Martinez, and Katie Mackey set a new American record in the 4 x 1500 meter relay running a time of 16:55.33 at the 2014 IAAF World Relays in Nassau, Bahamas.

On May 14, 2015, in Minneapolis, Minnesota, Kampf won her third USA 1 Mile Road Championship.

Competition record

USA National Championships

Road

Outdoor track and field

Indoor track and field

NCAA championships

Outdoor track and field

Indoor track and field

Cross country

Personal bests

References

External links
 Personal blog
 Team USA Minnesota (December 2009 – present)
 Diamond League profile

1987 births
Living people
American female middle-distance runners
People from Inver Grove Heights, Minnesota
21st-century American women